Sauropus macranthus, commonly known as  pumpkin fruit,  pumpkin bush or Atherton sauropus, is a rainforest tree from Asia, Malesia and north-east Queensland.  It is listed as "vulnerable" under the Commonwealth Environment Protection and Biodiversity Conservation Act 1999.

References

External links
Photo at the Australian Plant Image Index

macranthus